Greatest Hits: The First Ten Years is the first greatest hits album (sixth overall) by American singer and actress Vanessa Williams, released in the US on November 17, 1998 on Mercury Records. It features eleven of her previous recordings from the ten years starting from 1988, plus a new recording, a cover of Bobby Caldwell's "My Flame". This is the first Vanessa Williams album to feature her soundtrack contributions "Love Is", "Colors of the Wind" and "Where Do We Go From Here?".

The compilation includes all of Williams' singles to have charted on the Billboard Hot 100 in the US, except for four: "Darlin' I", "Just For Tonight", "Work to Do" and "The Way That You Love".

The only older tracks included on the album that did not chart on the Billboard Hot 100 are "Betcha Never" (from The Sweetest Days) and Williams's covers of Flora Purim's "Open Your Eyes, You Can Fly" and Simon Climie's "Oh How the Years Go By". Both these covers were originally released only on multi-artist compilations (although "Oh How The Years Go By" was subsequently included on Next).

Chart performance
The album failed to chart on the Billboard 200. "My Flame" was released as a single and gained airplay on mostly jazz and adult contemporary radio stations, but failed to chart on the Billboard Hot 100.

Track listing

Track information and credits verified from the album's liner notes. Some information was adapted from AllMusic.

References

1998 greatest hits albums
Vanessa Williams compilation albums
Albums produced by Brian McKnight
Albums produced by David Foster
Mercury Records compilation albums